Jacques Georges Deyverdun (8 May 1734, in Lausanne – 4 July 1789, in Aix-les-Bains) was a Swiss classical scholar and translator.  He translated Goethe's The Sorrows of Young Werther into French.  

Deyverdun met Edward Gibbon in Lausanne and the two became friends.  He also acted as tutor to several English noblemen on the Grand Tour such as Philip Stanhope, 5th Earl of Chesterfield and Sir Richard Worsley, 7th Baronet.

Notes

1734 births
1789 deaths
Swiss classical scholars
Swiss translators
People from Lausanne
Translators of Johann Wolfgang von Goethe